Saiyuki is a Japanese manga series by Kazuya Minekura which has multiple anime adaptations. The first adaptation of Saiyuki was a two episode OVA by Tokyo Kids. The first episode was released on April 23, 1999, while the second episode was released on August 27, 1999. A television series was created by Studio Pierrot and Dentsu entitled . The series aired on TV Tokyo from April 4, 2000, to March 27, 2001, spanning 50 episodes.

Another series,  was created by the same companies and it adapts from the manga of the same name. It aired on the same network from October 2, 2003, to March 25, 2004.

A sequel titled  was also created by the companies and aired on the same network from April 1, 2004, to September 23, 2004. ADV Films licensed Gensomaden Saiyuki and the film. The sequels Saiyuki Reload and Saiyuki Reload Gunlock are licensed by Geneon in North America, and consist of 25 and 26 episodes respectively. Saiyuki Reload is faithful to the manga from the fourteenth episode and onward, having deviated from it for the first 13 episodes. Saiyuki Reload Gunlock also starts off deviated from the manga, until midway into the series, but strays from it during its finale.

An anime television series adaptation of the Saiyuki Reload Blast manga series aired from July 5 to September 20, 2017, on Tokyo MX, TV Aichi, BS11, Sun TV. It ran for 12 episodes. Crunchyroll has licensed the series, and Funimation released it on home video as part of the two companies' partnership.

Enoki Films holds the U.S. license to Gensomaden Saiyuki under the title Saiyuki: Paradise Raiders. There has also been a film (Saiyuki: Requiem) adapted into English that is also licensed by ADV.

A new OVA has been released by Studio Pierrot, which covers the "Burial" arc of the Saiyuki Reload manga; it is called Saiyuki Reload: Burial. In 2011, a new original video animation (OVA) series, Saiyuki Gaiden was created based on the same name manga series written and illustrated by Kazuya Minekura, and it is a prequel to the manga series saiyuki which ended in Ichijinsha's Monthly Comic Zero-Sum magazine in 2009.

A new anime series produced by Liden Films titled Saiyuki Reload: Zeroin has been announced.  The main cast members reprised their roles. It aired from January 6 to March 31, 2022.

Series overview

Episode list

Gensomaden Saiyuki (2000–01)

Saiyuki Reload (2003–04)

Saiyuki Reload GunLock (2004)

Saiyuki Reload Blast (2017)

Saiyuki Reload: Zeroin (2022)

OVAs

Saiyuki Premium (1999)

Saiyuki: Kibō no Zaika (2002)

Saiyuki Reload: Burial (2007–08)

Saiyuki Gaiden (2011–13)

References

External links
Official Studio Pierrot Gensomaden Saiyuki website 
Official Studio Pierrot Gensomaden Saiyuki: Requiem For the One Not Chosen website 
Official Studio Pierrot Saiyuki Reload website 
Saiyuki Reload Gunlock website 
Official TV Tokyo Gensomaden Saiyuki website 

Saiyuki (manga)
Saiyuki